Procyanidin B6 is a B type proanthocyanidin.

Procyanidin B6 is a catechin-(4α→6)-catechin dimer. It can be found in grape seeds and in beer.

Chemical synthesis 
Molar equivalents of synthetic (2R,3S,4R or S)-leucocyanidin and (+)-catechin condense with exceptional rapidity at pH 5 under ambient conditions to give the all-trans-[4,8]- and [4,6]-bi-[(+)-catechins] (procyanidins B3 and B6) the all-trans-[4,8:4,8]- and [4,8:4,6]-tri-[(+)-catechins] (procyanidin C2 and isomer).

References 

Procyanidin dimers